Tobacco smoke is a sooty aerosol produced by the incomplete combustion of tobacco during the smoking of cigarettes and other tobacco products. Temperatures in burning cigarettes range from about 400 °C between puffs to about 900 °C during a puff. During the burning of the cigarette tobacco (itself a complex mixture), thousands of chemical substances are generated by combustion, distillation, pyrolysis and pyrosynthesis. Tobacco smoke is used as a fumigant and inhalant.

Composition 

The particles in tobacco smoke are liquid aerosol droplets (about 20% water), with a mass median aerodynamic diameter (MMAD) that is submicrometer (and thus, fairly "lung-respirable" by humans). The droplets are present in high concentrations (some estimates are as high as 1010 droplets per cm3). Most cigarettes today contain a cigarette filter, which can reduce "tar" and nicotine smoke yields up to 50% by several different mechanisms, with an even greater removal rate for other classes of compounds (e.g., phenols).

Tobacco smoke may be grouped into a particulate phase (trapped on a glass-fiber pad, and termed "TPM" (total particulate matter)) and a gas/vapor phase (which passes through such a glass-fiber pad). "Tar" is mathematically determined by subtracting the weight of the nicotine and water from the TPM. However, several components of tobacco smoke (e.g., hydrogen cyanide, formaldehyde, phenanthrene, and pyrene) do not fit neatly into this rather arbitrary classification, because they are distributed among the solid, liquid and gaseous phases.

Tobacco smoke contains a number of toxicologically significant chemicals and groups of chemicals, including polycyclic aromatic hydrocarbons (benzopyrene), tobacco-specific nitrosamines (NNK, NNN), aldehydes (acrolein, formaldehyde), carbon monoxide, hydrogen cyanide, nitrogen oxides (nitrogen dioxide), benzene, toluene, phenols (phenol, cresol), aromatic amines (nicotine, ABP (4-Aminobiphenyl)), and harmala alkaloids. The radioactive element polonium-210 is also known to occur in tobacco smoke. The chemical composition of smoke depends on puff frequency, intensity, volume, and duration at different stages of cigarette consumption.

Between 1933 and the late 1940s, the yields from an average cigarette varied from 33 to 49 mg "tar" and from less than 1 to 3 mg nicotine. In the 1960s and 1970s, the average yield from cigarettes in Western Europe and the USA was around 16 mg tar and 1.5 mg nicotine per cigarette. Current average levels are lower. This has been achieved in a variety of ways including use of selected strains of tobacco plant, changes in agricultural and curing procedures, use of reconstituted sheets (reprocessed tobacco leaf wastes), incorporation of tobacco stalks, reduction of the amount of tobacco needed to fill a cigarette by expanding it (like puffed wheat) to increase its "filling power", and by the use of filters and high-porosity wrapping papers. The development of lower "tar" and nicotine cigarettes has tended to yield products that lacked the taste components to which the smoker had become accustomed. In order to keep such products acceptable to the consumer, the manufacturers reconstitute aroma or flavor.

Tobacco polyphenols (e. g., caffeic acid, chlorogenic acid, scopoletin, rutin) determine the taste and quality of the smoke. Freshly cured tobacco leaf is unfit for use because of its pungent and irritating smoke. After fermentation and aging, the leaf delivers mild and aromatic smoke.

Tumorigenic agents

Safety 

Tobacco smoke, besides being an irritant and significant indoor air pollutant, is known to cause lung cancer, heart disease, chronic obstructive pulmonary disease (COPD), emphysema, and other serious diseases in smokers (and in non-smokers as well). The actual mechanisms by which smoking can cause so many diseases remain largely unknown. Many attempts have been made to produce lung cancer in animals exposed to tobacco smoke by the inhalation route, without success. It is only by collecting the "tar" and repeatedly painting this on to mice that tumors are produced, and these tumors are very different from those tumors exhibited by smokers. Tobacco smoke is associated with an increased risk of developing respiratory conditions such as bronchitis, pneumonia, and asthma. Tobacco smoke aerosols generated at temperatures below 400 ℃ did not test positive in the Ames assay.

In spite of all changes in cigarette design and manufacturing since the 1960s, the use of filters and "light" cigarettes has neither decreased the nicotine intake per cigarette, nor has it lowered the incidence of lung cancers (NCI, 2001; IARC 83, 2004; U.S. Surgeon General, 2004). The shift over the years from higher- to lower-yield cigarettes may explain the change in the pathology of lung cancer. That is, the percentage of lung cancers that are adenocarcinomas has increased, while the percentage of squamous cell cancers has decreased. The change in tumor type is believed to reflect the higher nitrosamine delivery of lower-yield cigarettes and the increased depth or volume of inhalation of lower-yield cigarettes to compensate for lower level concentrations of nicotine in the smoke.

In the United States, lung cancer incidence and mortality rates are particularly high among African American men. Lung cancer tends to be most common in developed countries, particularly in North America and Europe, and less common in developing countries, particularly in Africa and South America.

See also 
 Liquid smoke
 Electronic cigarette aerosol
 Tobacco smoke enema

References 

Aerosols
Tobacco smoking
Tobacco
Toxicology
Smoke